Amentotaxus poilanei is a species of conifer in the yew family, Taxaceae. It is endemic to Vietnam. Its common name is Poilane's catkin yew.

References

poilanei
Vulnerable plants
Endemic flora of Vietnam
Taxonomy articles created by Polbot